Phoma oncidii-sphacelati is a fungal plant pathogen infecting cattleyas.

References

External links 
 Index Fungorum
 USDA ARS Fungal Database

oncidii-sphacelati
Fungal plant pathogens and diseases
Orchid diseases
Fungi described in 1899